Carlos Jiménez may refer to:

Carlos Jiménez
Carlos Jiménez Villarejo
Carlos Jiménez Mabarak
Carlos Jiménez Díaz
Carlos Jiménez Macías
Carlos Jiménez (Bolivian footballer)
Carlos Jiménez (Costa Rican footballer)
Carlos Jiménez (volleyball)
Carlos Javier Cuéllar Jiménez (born 1981), Spanish motocross footballer
Carlos Campano Jiménez (born 1985), Spanish motocross rider